Heritage Woods is an unincorporated community in Alberta, Canada within Rocky View County that is recognized as a designated place by Statistics Canada. It is adjacent to the City of Calgary to the east.

Demographics 

See also 
List of communities in Alberta
List of designated places in Alberta

References 

Designated places in Alberta